Jericho is an unincorporated community in Henry County, Kentucky, in the United States.

History
Jericho was a station on the Louisville and Cincinnati Railroad. A post office was established at Jericho in 1852, and remained in operation until it was discontinued in 1965.

In Media
The Band's "The Caves of Jericho" on their 1993 album Jericho refers to Jericho, Kentucky.

References

Unincorporated communities in Henry County, Kentucky
Unincorporated communities in Kentucky